Airborne lifeboats were powered lifeboats that were made to be dropped by fixed-wing aircraft into water to aid in air-sea rescue operations. An airborne lifeboat was to be carried by a heavy bomber specially modified to handle the external load of the lifeboat. The airborne lifeboat was intended to be dropped by parachute to land within reach of the survivors of an accident on the ocean, specifically airmen survivors of an emergency water landing. Airborne lifeboats were used during World War II by the United Kingdom and on Dumbo rescue missions by the United States from 1943 until the mid-1950s.

Development 
Air-sea rescue by flying boat or floatplane was a method used by various nations before World War II to pick up aviators or sailors who were struggling in the water. Training and weather accidents could require an aircrew to be pulled from the water, and these two types of seaplane were occasionally used for that purpose. The limitation was that if the water's surface were too rough, the aircraft would not be able to land.
Though closer to shore (e.g. in the English Channel) the RAF Air Sea Rescue Service operated High Speed Launches but until 1943, the most that could be done was to drop emergency supplies to the survivors, including an inflatable rubber dinghy carried as-standard in RAF aircraft.

The airborne lifeboat was developed to provide downed airmen with a more navigable and seaworthy vessel that could be sailed greater distances than the rubber dinghy. One of the reasons necessitating this was that when ditching or abandoning an aircraft near enemy-held territory, often the tides and winds would propel the rubber dinghy toward shore, despite the efforts of the occupants to paddle away, resulting in their eventual capture.

British lifeboats

Uffa Fox 

The first air-dropped lifeboat was British, a  wooden canoe-shaped boat designed in 1943 by Uffa Fox to be dropped by Royal Air Force (RAF) Avro Lancaster heavy bombers for the rescue of aircrew downed in the Channel. It was balanced so that it would right itself if it overturned—all subsequent airborne lifeboats were given this feature. When it hit the water the parachutes were jettisoned and rockets launched  lifelines. Coamings were inflated on the descent to give it self-righting.

The lifeboats were first carried by Lockheed Hudson aircraft in February 1943. Later, Vickers Warwick bombers carried the Mark II lifeboat. The Fox boats successfully saved downed aircrew as well as glider infantrymen dropped in the water during Operation Market-Garden.

The lifeboats carried emergency equipment, a radio, waterproof suits, rations and medical supplies.

Saunders-Roe 

In early 1953, Saunders-Roe at Anglesey completed the Mark 3 airborne lifeboat to be fitted underneath the Avro Shackleton maritime reconnaissance aircraft. The Mark 3 was made entirely of aluminium unlike the Fox Mark 1 which was made of wood. As the lifeboat dropped, pressurized bottles of carbon dioxide inflated the self-righting chambers at the bow and stern. Upon touching the water, the parachutes were released to blow away, and a drogue opened to slow the boat's drift and aid in the survivors reaching the lifeboat. At the same time, two rockets fired, one to each side, sending out floating lines to provide easier access to the lifeboat for ditched airmen. Doors that opened from the outside provided access to the interior, and the flat deck was made to be self-draining. Sails and a fishing kit were provided, as well as an awning and screen to protect against sun and sea spray. It carried protective suits, inflatable pillows, sleeping bags, and a first-aid kit.

American lifeboats

Higgins 

In the United States, Andrew Higgins evaluated the Fox boat and felt it was too weak to survive mishap in emergency operations. In November 1943, Higgins assigned engineers from his company to make a sturdier version with two engines. Higgins Industries, known for making landing craft (LCVPs) and PT boats, produced the A-1 lifeboat, a 1½-ton (1400 kg),  airborne lifeboat with waterproof internal compartments so that it would not sink if swamped or overturned. Intended to be dropped by modified Boeing B-17 Flying Fortresses, it was ready for production in early 1944.

EDO Corporation 

The A-3 lifeboat was an airborne lifeboat developed by the EDO Corporation in 1947 for the United States Air Force (USAF) as a successor to the A-1 lifeboat. It was built of aluminum alloy to be carried by the SB-29 Super Dumbo. Various B-29s served air-sea rescue duties on a rotating basis toward the end of the Pacific War, and after the war 16 were converted to carry the A-3 lifeboat. The SB-29 served until the mid-1950s. Approximately 100 of the EDO lifeboats were built but very few rescues were attributed to them.

Douglas Aircraft Radio Controlled Life Raft 
The airborne life boats used by the USAF at the start of the 1950s had two major flaws; they required specially modified aircraft to drop them, and in heavy weather and high winds when dropped they could drift away from the exhausted survivors or be swamped and over turned. The USAF, "Air Sea Rescue Unit of the Air Material Command", was tasked with studying the problem and coming up with a solution. Their solution was an air dropped life boat which before it inflated in the water, looked like a torpedo and could be carried by almost any aircraft in service that had heavy wing pylons.  When the boat was dropped near the survivors, on impacting the water large inflatable tubes which were connected to the rescue torpedo inflated, resulting in a radio controlled self-propelled life raft. The pilot would then start the life raft engine by radio control and steer the life raft to the survivors. When the survivors had boarded the life raft one of the rescue aircraft circling above would continue to control and steer the life raft to a safe zone for pick up, or allow the survivors to take over control.  The life raft contained its own autopilot, water, dehydrated food, a two way rescue radio and enough fuel for 300 miles of travel.<ref>"Radio Pilots Self Inflating Rescue Boat" "Popular Mechanics, September 1951, pp. 100–101</ref>

 See also 
 Lindholme Gear
 Vincent lifeboat engine

 References 
Notes

Bibliography
 Hardwick, Jack; Ed Schnepf. The Making of the Great Aviation Films. General Aviation Series, Volume 2. Challenge Publications, 1989.
 Morison, Samuel Eliot. History of United States Naval Operations in World War II: The struggle for Guadalcanal, August 1942 – February 1943. University of Illinois Press, 2001. 
 Morison, Samuel Eliot.  The Two-Ocean War: A Short History of the United States Navy in the Second World War. Naval Institute Press, 2007. 
 Strahan, Jerry E. Andrew Jackson Higgins and the Boats That Won World War II. LSU Press, 1998. 

 External links 

 
 2008 photograph of Uffa Fox airborne lifeboat
 Airborne Lifeboats – a 1945 Flight'' article on the airborne lifeboat.
 An airborne lifeboat being dropped to the survivors of a ditched B-17
 Airborne Lifeboats – Naval Technology and Life on Board

English inventions
Lifeboats
Rescue equipment
Rescue aviation